The Tamyen language (also spelled as Tamien, Thamien) is one of eight Ohlone languages, once spoken by Tamyen people in Northern California. 

Tamyen (also called Santa Clara Costanoan) has been extended to mean the Santa Clara Valley Indians, as well as for the language they spoke. Tamyen is listed as one of the Costanoan language dialects in the Utian family. It was the primary language that Natives spoke at the first and second Mission Santa Clara (both founded in 1777). Linguistically, it is thought that Chochenyo, Tamyen and Ramaytush were close dialects of a single language.

See also
 Ohlone tribes and villages in Santa Clara Valley
 Tamien Station

Notes

Further reading
 Levy, Richard. 1978. Costanoan, in Handbook of North American Indians, vol. 8 (California). William C. Sturtevant, and Robert F. Heizer, eds. Washington, DC: Smithsonian Institution, 1978.  / 0160045754, pages 485-495.
 Milliken, Randall. A Time of Little Choice: The Disintegration of Tribal Culture in the San Francisco Bay Area 1769-1910 Menlo Park, CA: Ballena Press Publication, 1995.  (alk. paper)
 Teixeira, Lauren. The Costanoan/Ohlone Indians of the San Francisco and Monterey Bay Area, A Research Guide. Menlo Park, CA: Ballena Press Publication, 1997. .

External links
 Tamyen, Survey of California and Other Indian Languages
 Comparative vocabulary, Tamyen
 Tamyen, California Language Archive
 Tamyen, Papers of John P. Harrington, Part 2, Northern and Central California
 Tamien Nation, language, and culture

Ohlone languages
Extinct languages of North America
History of the San Francisco Bay Area
Culture in the San Francisco Bay Area

hr:Tamyen